Elliott Maddox (born December 21, 1947) is an American former Major League Baseball player. In , he was drafted by the Detroit Tigers in the first round (20th pick) of the draft (secondary phase). He made his MLB debut in 1970.

Early years
Maddox was born in East Orange, New Jersey and grew up in Vauxhall, New Jersey. He graduated from Union High School in Union County, New Jersey. As a senior, he was selected by the Houston Astros in the fourth round of the 1966 Major League Baseball draft, but chose to attend the University of Michigan, instead. In June , he was drafted by the Detroit Tigers in the first round (20th pick) of the draft (secondary phase). He converted to Judaism in the 1970s.

Detroit Tigers
An exceptional all around fielder, Maddox split his minor league career between the outfield & third base. Likewise, when he joined the Tigers, he served as both a fourth outfielder & third baseman Don Wert's backup. He batted .248 with three home runs and 24 runs batted in his only season in Detroit to earn "Tigers Rookie of the Year" honors from the Detroit Sports Broadcasters' Association. The day after Commissioner of Baseball Bowie Kuhn lifted former Cy Young Award winner Denny McLain's indefinite suspension from Major League Baseball, Maddox was packaged with McLain, Wert & pitcher Norm McRae, and shipped to the Washington Senators for pitchers Joe Coleman & Jim Hannan, and infielders Ed Brinkman  & Aurelio Rodríguez.

Washington Senators
Maddox spent much of the  season batting below .200. He was batting .171 with one home run & twelve RBIs at the All-Star break, but managed to bring his average up to .217 with a hot August (.357 avg.) and September (.273 avg.). While he began the season in a similar utility player role to that which he had in Detroit, as he began to hit toward the end of the season, Manager and baseball legend Ted Williams began using him in a lefty/righty platoon with Del Unser in center field, where he led all American League outfielders in range factor per 9 innings (3.05). On September 30, the last day of the season, Maddox drove in the final run in franchise history.

Texas Rangers
Owner Bob Short moved the Senators to Arlington, Texas for the  season, where they became the Texas Rangers. In his new location, Maddox once again found himself in a platoon in center. This time, with former first round pick, Joe Lovitto. Williams took advantage of Maddox's speed, using him in the lead-off spot far more than he had the previous season. For the season, he scored forty runs & stole a career high twenty bases. Especially Martin, with whom Maddox had a strained relationship. (Maddox had learned after his trade from the Detroit Tigers that Martin, who was managing the Tigers, had nicknamed Maddox as "Downtown Nigger.") During Spring training , the New York Yankees purchased him from the Rangers.

New York Yankees
Maddox's Yankees career began slowly, as he batted just .174 in April. In May, Maddox batted .371. Add to that the eight walks he drew, he had a .488 on-base percentage for the month, prompting manager Bill Virdon to move Maddox into the lead-off spot. He also started the season playing right field, however, soon switched positions with All-Star center fielder Bobby Murcer. For the season, he finishing sixth in the AL with a .303 average with a career high 75 runs scored in a career high 550 plate appearances. He also logged career highs in at bats (466), RBIs (45), doubles (26), on-base percentage (.395), walks (69) & OPS (.781). He had fourteen assists from the center field (18 total) & four double plays, leading all AL center fielders in both categories.

In a Spring training game with the Rangers on March 21, Maddox was hit by a pitch from Jim Bibby in the first inning. In the third, Maddox's bat "slipped" out of his hands toward Bibby on the pitchers mound. In the sixth, Stan Thomas fired a pitch over Maddox's head. In the seventh, Yankees pitcher Mike Wallace retaliated by throwing two pitches close to second baseman Dave Nelson's head. The second one knocked him down, causing both benches to clear. The whole situation was incited by negative comments about Billy Martin that Maddox had made in the press a week earlier.

Maddox proceeded to have another great season in 1975, until an injury cut it short. In the ninth inning of a night game against the Chicago White Sox on June 13, he slipped on the rain-soaked field in Shea Stadium (where the Yankees played home games in 1974 & 1975) running after a fly ball. At the time of the injury, he was batting .307 (.369 against lefties, and .360 with 2 outs, and runners in scoring position) with a .382 on-base percentage. He'd been hit by a pitch seven times during the regular season, including once by Thomas, and once by Bibby. The Rangers fired Martin 95 games into the season. Shortly afterwards, the Yankees fired Virdon, and replaced him with Martin.

He returned in September in time to be, and was part of the Yankees' post season roster. The only time Maddox reached the post season in his career, Maddox went two for nine, with an RBI in game three of the 1976 American League Championship Series against the Kansas City Royals. He had one hit, a triple in five at bats against Cincinnati's "Big Red Machine" in the World Series.

Baltimore Orioles
In a transaction involving three center fielders, Maddox and Rick Bladt were dealt from the Yankees to the Baltimore Orioles for Paul Blair on January 20, 1977. Maddox, whose first knee operation in September 1975 failed to completely correct all problems, underwent a second and more successful surgery on November 29, 1976, over the objections of Yankees general manager Gabe Paul who thought it was unnecessary and thus traded him for that reason. Maddox's Orioles debut was delayed by his rehabilitation from that second knee operation. By the time Maddox finally joined the O's in mid July, Al Bumbry established himself as a .300 hitter, and earned the starting center field job. The Orioles were on the road when Maddox joined his new club on July 14. When they returned home, Orioles PA announcer Rex Barney mistakenly referred to him as "Lester Maddox," mixing him up with the segregationist former governor of Georgia.

Maddox went two for twelve to start his Orioles career. A return to Yankee Stadium helped get him out of this slump. He went three for four with a double & a walk in his first game back. The next day, he delivered an eighth inning two run single in his team's come from behind victory over Martin & the Yankees. He batted .262 with two home runs & nine RBIs in a part-time role in his half season in Baltimore. After which, he filed for free agency.

New York Mets
Maddox became just the second free agent in franchise history when he signed with the New York Mets on November 30, 1977. The Orioles attempted to retain him but weren't able to match the Mets' fully guaranteed $1 million offer. Therefore, Maddox was shifted to right field upon his return to New York. Unfortunately, that return was delayed until the eighteenth game of the season due to a pulled leg muscle suffered in Spring training.

Maddox's bat was cool when he first got activated (.233 avg. through May), but his propensity for drawing a walk still had him on base at a .362 rate. By the end of the season, he brought his average up to .257, while drawing a career high 71 walks for a .370 on base percentage. He also made 43 appearances at third (38 starts), the most in his career. This displeased Maddox, and the following Spring, he indicated that he would like to be traded.

Regardless, Maddox went into the  season with the Mets. His wish to play right field was granted, however, a mid April ankle injury knocked him out of the line up for eighteen games. Meanwhile, Joel Youngblood, who was in a similar positionless situation as Maddox, took over in right field. In Maddox's absence, Youngblood batted .327 with four home runs & eleven RBIs to take the right field job away. When Maddox returned, his role was, once again, undefined. He was sidelined a second time in late July by a pulled hamstring, which kept him out of the line up for another month.
 
By the time Spring training  got under way, the Mets were set with Maddox at third & Youngblood in right. Maddox, once again, expressed displeasure with this decision. Regardless, he did a more than adequate job at third (.956 fielding percentage. League average, .948) while putting together his first full, healthy season since 1974. He hit a career high four home runs, and led the league in being hit by pitches (6), however, his overall production dipped (.246 avg.).

Retirement
Maddox returned to the Yankees during Spring training 1981, but failed to make the club. In June, he signed as a free agent with the Philadelphia Phillies. He spent the season with their triple A affiliate, the Oklahoma City 89ers, before retiring.

Career statistics

He had a career .989 fielding percentage as an outfielder.

Maddox v. City of New York
Maddox sued the New York Yankees as his employer, the New York Mets as lessees of Shea Stadium, and the City of New York as owners of the stadium following his injury in 1975. City of New York. The decision read as follows:

Working as a counselor for Florida's Division of Children & Families, Maddox collected $36,000 in pay & medical benefits in  &  after filing a claim that he was too hobbled to work. DCF Investigators videotaped Maddox walking, running, bending both knees, performing pitching windups & carrying baseball equipment while running baseball camps in his hometown of Coral Springs, Florida.

Personal life
Maddox began considering Judaism in high school, and took Judaic studies courses while at the University of Michigan, and converted to Judaism in 1975. Maddox also took pre-med courses before switching to pre-law, and graduated in 1976 in the midst of his baseball career.

After retiring from baseball, Maddox became an investment banker. Shortly after his move to Coral Springs, he became a foster-care counselor for Broward County.

Maddox had a son (Jared Maddox) with wife Ursula Prejean Maddox in 1980

Maddox enjoyed world travel, and coached baseball and football in his part-time home of Israel. He also established the first Little League teams in Poland. In 2004, he was inducted into the Jewish Sports Hall of Fame. In 2007, Maddox was inducted into the Union County Baseball Hall of Fame.

See also
List of select Jewish baseball players

References

External links

The Ultimate Mets Database

Further reading
 This chapter in Ruttman's oral history, based on a March 9, 2008 interview with Maddox conducted for the book, discusses Maddox's American, Jewish, baseball, and life experiences from youth to the present.

1947 births
Living people
African-American Jews
African-American baseball players
Baltimore Orioles players
Baseball players from New Jersey
Converts to Judaism
Detroit Tigers players
Jewish American baseball players
Jewish Major League Baseball players
Major League Baseball center fielders
Major League Baseball outfielders
Major League Baseball right fielders
Major League Baseball second basemen
Michigan Wolverines baseball players
New York Mets players
New York Yankees players
People from Union Township, Union County, New Jersey
People from East Orange, New Jersey
Sportspeople from Coral Springs, Florida
Rocky Mount Pines players
Lakeland Tigers players
Texas Rangers players
Washington Senators (1961–1971) players
Sportspeople from East Orange, New Jersey
Sportspeople from the New York metropolitan area
University of Michigan College of Literature, Science, and the Arts alumni
Union High School (New Jersey) alumni
21st-century African-American people
21st-century American Jews
20th-century African-American sportspeople